This is the list of the 54 appointed members of the European Parliament for Poland in the 1999 to 2004 session, from 1 May 2004 to 19 July 2004.

B 
 Adam Biela NI LPR
 Adam Bielan UEN PiS

C 
 Andrzej Chronowski PPE-DE Senate 2001
 Zbigniew Chrzanowski PPE-DE SKL
 Danuta Ciborowska PSE SLD
 Grażyna Ciemniak PSE SLD
 Zygmunt Cybulski PSE SLD

D 
 Bernard Drzęźla PSE SLD

F 
 Krzysztof Filipek NI Samoobrona

G 
 Piotr Gadzinowski PSE SLD
 Andrzej Gałażewski PPE-DE PO
 Andrzej Gawłowski PSE SLD
 Maciej Giertych NI LPR
 Genowefa Grabowska PSE SDPL
 Zofia Grzebiasz-Nowicka PSE SLD
 Andrzej Grzyb PPE-DE PSL-PBL

I 
 Tadeusz Iwiński PSE SLD

J 
 Jerzy Jaskiernia PSE SLD

K 
 Ryszard Kalisz PSE SLD
 Michał Kamiński UEN PiS
 Bogdan Klich PPE-DE PO
 Eugeniusz Kłopotek PPE-DE PSL-PBL
 Wacław Klukowski NI PSL-PBL
 Bronisława Kowalska PSE SLD
 Józef Kubica PSE SLD

L 
 Andrzej Lepper NI Samoobrona
 Janusz Lewandowski PPE-DE PO
 Bogusław Liberadzki PSE SLD
 Marcin Libicki UEN PiS
 Janusz Lisak PSE UP
 Bogusław Litwiniec PSE SLD
 Stanisław Łyżwiński NI Samoobrona

M 
 Antoni Macierewicz NI RKN

P 
 Agnieszka Pasternak PSE SDPL
 Andrzej Pęczak PSE SLD
 Jerzy Pieniążek PSE SLD
 Bogdan Podgórski PSE SLD
 Jacek Protasiewicz PPE-DE PO
 Sylwia Pusz PSE SDPL

R 
 Krzysztof Rutkowski NI FKP

S 
 Czesław Siekierski PPE-DE PSL-PBL
 Robert Smoleń PSE SLD
 Jerzy Smorawiński PPE-DE Koło Senatorów
 Aleksander Szczygło UEN PiS

T 
 Jan Tomaka PPE-DE PO
 Witold Tomczak NI LPR

W 
 Jerzy Wenderlich PSE SLD
 Marek Widuch PSE SLD
 Marek Wikliński PSE SLD
 Małgorzata Winiarczyk-Kossakowska PSE SDPL
 Genowefa Wiśniowska NI Samoobrona
 Edmund Wittbrodt PPE-DE Senate 2001
 Janusz Wojciechowski PPE-DE PSL-PBL

Z 
 Marian Żenkiewicz PSE SLD

References 

2004
List
Poland